A kimono is a Japanese traditional garment. 

Kimono may also refer to:

Music
kimono (band), an Icelandic-Canadian math rock band
Kimono Draggin', an American avant-garde Indie Rock band
Ras Kimono (1958–2018), Africa reggae artist

Other uses
Kimono, a character in the My Little Pony franchise
Kimono: Fashioning Culture, a 1993 book by American anthropologist Liza Dalby

See also
Anna Kimonos (born 1975)